This is a list of open-access journals by field. The list contains notable journals which have a policy of full open access. It does not include delayed open access journals, hybrid open access journals, or related collections or indexing services.

True open-access journals can be split into two categories: 
diamond or platinum open-access journals, which charge no additional publication, open access or article processing fees
gold open-access journals, which charge publication fees (also called article processing charges, APCs).

Agriculture 
 African Journal of Food, Agriculture, Nutrition and Development
 Bulletin of Insectology
 Open Access Journal of Medicinal and Aromatic Plants
 Open Agriculture
Journal of Horticultural Sciences

Astronomy 
 Journal of the Korean Astronomical Society
 Open Astronomy

Bioethics 
 AMA Journal of Ethics
 Canadian Journal of Bioethics
 Indian Journal of Medical Ethics

Biology 
 African Invertebrates
 Biology of Sex Differences
 Biology Open
 BMC Biology
 BMC Evolutionary Biology
 BMC Genomics
 BMC Systems Biology
 Cell Reports
 Check List
 Contributions to Zoology
 Ecology and Evolution
 eLife
 F1000Research
 Genome Biology
 International Journal of Biological Sciences
 Israel Journal of Entomology
 Molecular Systems Biology
 Myrmecological News
 Oncotarget
 Open Biology
 Open Life Sciences
 PLOS Biology
 PLOS Computational Biology
 PLOS Genetics
 Scientific Reports
 Stem Cell Reports
 ZooKeys

Botany 
 Acta Botanica Brasilica
 Botanical Studies
 Phytologia
 Plant Ecology and Evolution

Chemistry 
 Arkivoc
 Beilstein Journal of Organic Chemistry
 Chemical Science
 Molecules
 Open Chemistry
 Organic Syntheses
 RSC Advances

Computer science 
 Computational Linguistics
 IEEE Access
 Journal of Artificial Intelligence Research
 Journal of Computational Geometry
 Journal of Computer Graphics Techniques
 Journal of Formalized Reasoning
 Journal of Machine Learning Research
 Journal of Object Technology
Journal of Open Source Software
 Journal of Statistical Software
 Logical Methods in Computer Science
 Semantic Web
 Theory of Computing

Ecology 
 Ecography

Economics and finance 
 The Journal of Entrepreneurial Finance
 Real-World Economics Review
 Theoretical Economics

Education 
 Australasian Journal of Educational Technology
 Comunicar
 Education Policy Analysis Archives
 Educational Technology & Society
 Journal of Higher Education Outreach and Engagement
 Journal of International Students

Energy 
 Energies

Engineering 
 Advances in Production Engineering & Management
 Frontiers in Heat and Mass Transfer
 Open Engineering

Geography and environmental studies 
 Conservation and Society
 Ecology and Society
 Environmental Health Perspectives
 Environmental Research Letters
 Fennia
 GSA Today
 Journal of Political Ecology
 Journal of Spatial Information Science
 Open Geosciences
 Nature Environment and Pollution Technology

Geology
 Austrian Journal of Earth Sciences
Brazilian Journal of Geology

Humanities and other journals 
 Anamesa
 Continent
 Culture Machine
 Digital Humanities Quarterly
 First Monday
 GHLL
 Medieval Worlds
 Programming Historian
 Reti Medievali Rivista
 Sign Systems Studies
 Southern Spaces
 Transmotion

Language and linguistics 
 Glossa
 Language Documentation & Conservation
 Per Linguam

Law 
 Duke Law Journal
 German Law Journal
 Health and Human Rights
 Melbourne University Law Review

Library and information science 
 College & Research Libraries
 Evidence Based Library and Information Practice
 In the Library with the Lead Pipe
 Information Technologies and International Development
 Scientific Data
 Webology

Materials science
 Polymers
 Science and Technology of Advanced Materials

Mathematics 
 Acta Mathematica
 Advances in Group Theory and Applications
 Algebraic Geometry
 Annales Academiae Scientiarum Fennicae. Mathematica
 Annales de l'Institut Fourier
 Arkiv för Matematik
 Ars Mathematica Contemporanea
 Australasian Journal of Combinatorics
 Discrete Analysis
 Discrete Mathematics & Theoretical Computer Science
 Documenta Mathematica
 Electronic Communications in Probability
 Electronic Journal of Combinatorics
 Electronic Journal of Probability
 Electronic Transactions on Numerical Analysis
 Forum of Mathematics
 Hardy-Ramanujan Journal
 Journal de Théorie des Nombres de Bordeaux
 Journal of Formalized Reasoning
 Journal of Graph Algorithms and Applications
 Journal of Integer Sequences
 Mathematics and Mechanics of Complex Systems
 Münster Journal of Mathematics
 The New York Journal of Mathematics
 Open Mathematics
 Rendiconti di Matematica e delle sue Applicazioni
 Séminaire Lotharingien de Combinatoire

Medicine, pharmaceutical and health sciences 
(omitting journals already previously mentioned)
 Annals of Saudi Medicine
 Bangladesh Journal of Pharmacology
 Biomedical Imaging and Intervention Journal
 BMC Health Services Research
 BMC Medicine
 BMJ Open
 Bosnian Journal of Basic Medical Sciences
 British Columbia Medical Journal
 British Medical Journal
 Canadian Medical Association Journal
 Clinical and Translational Science
 Dermatology Online Journal
 Emerging Infectious Diseases
 International Journal of Medical Sciences
 Journal of the American Heart Association
 Journal of Clinical Investigation
 Journal of Postgraduate Medicine
 The New England Journal of Medicine
 Open Heart
 Open Medicine
 PLOS Medicine
 PLOS Neglected Tropical Diseases
 PLOS Pathogens
 Scientia Pharmaceutica
 Swiss Medical Weekly

Music
Music Theory Online

Nutrition 
 Journal of Nutrition

Philosophy 
 Journal of Ethics & Social Philosophy
 Philosophers' Imprint

Physics 
 New Journal of Physics
 Open Physics
Optica
Optics Express
 Physical Review X
 Physical Review Research

Pluridisciplinary 
 GigaScience
Nature Communications
 PLOS ONE
 Royal Society Open Science
 Science Advances
 Scientific Reports

Political science 
 Caucasian Review of International Affairs
 Central European Journal of International and Security Studies
 Journal of Politics & Society

Robotics 
 Paladyn

Social science 
 Cultural Anthropology
 Demography
 Frontiers in Psychology
 Jadaliyya
 Journal of Artificial Societies and Social Simulation
 Journal of Political Ecology
 Journal of World-Systems Research

Statistics 

Bayesian Analysis
Brazilian Journal of Probability and Statistics
Chilean Journal of Statistics
Electronic Journal of Statistics
Journal of Official Statistics
Journal of Modern Applied Statistical Methods
Journal of Statistical Software
Journal of Statistics Education
Revista Colombiana de Estadistica
REVSTAT
SORT
Statistics Surveys
Survey Methodology/Techniques d'enquête
The R Journal

See also

 Directory of Open Access Journals
 List of academic databases and search engines
 Lists of academic journals
 Open access around the world

Internet-related lists
 
Lists of academic journals